Phimophis is a genus of snakes in the subfamily Dipsadinae. The genus is endemic to South America.

Species
Three species are currently recognized.
Phimophis guerini 
Phimophis guianensis 
Phimophis vittatus 

Nota bene: A binomial authority in parentheses indicates that the species was originally described in a genus other than Phimophis.

Etymology
The specific name, guerini, is in honor of French entomologist Félix Édouard Guérin-Méneville.

References

Further reading
Cope ED (1860). "Catalogue of Colubridæ in the Museum of the Academy of Natural Sciences of Philadelphia. I. Calamarinæ". Proc. Acad. Nat. Sci. Philadelphia 12: 74-79. (Phimophis, new genus, p. 79).
Freiberg M (1982). Snakes of South America. Hong Kong: T.F.H. Publications. 189 pp. . (Genus Phimophis, p. 107).

Dipsadinae
Snake genera